Atlanta Municipal Airport may refer to:

 Atlanta Municipal Airport (Michigan) in Atlanta, Michigan, United States (FAA: Y93)
 Hall-Miller Municipal Airport in Atlanta, Texas
 The former name of Hartsfield-Jackson Atlanta International Airport in Atlanta, Georgia, United States (FAA/IATA: ATL)